Events from the year 1454 in Ireland.

Incumbent
Lord: Henry VI

Births
 Thomas FitzGerald, 11th Earl of Desmond

Deaths